"Free Like the Wind" is a song by German recording artist Alexander Klaws. Written and produced by frequent contributor Dieter Bohlen, it was released as the lead single from Klaws's second album Here I Am (2004), while serving as the theme song for the television film Held der Gladiatoren (2003). Upon its release, the uplifting ballad debuted at number-one on the German Singles Chart, become his second single to do so, and reached number two in both Austria and Switzerland.

Formats and track listings

Credits and personnel
Credits taken from Here I Am liner notes.

 Artwork — Ronald Reinsberg 
 Lyrics, music, production — Dieter Bohlen
 Mixing — Jeo

Charts

Weekly charts

Year-end charts

Certifications

References

External links
  
 

2003 singles
2003 songs
Alexander Klaws songs
Songs written by Dieter Bohlen
Hansa Records singles